Denise A. Austin is an Australian Pentecostal historian, particularly focused on Australia and the Asia-Pacific region.

Austin is the Deputy Vice President of Research and Standards, and Professor of History at Alphacrucis College. She is also the Director of the Australasian Pentecostal Studies Centre.

Early life and education
Denise A. Austin was born in Brisbane in 1969 to Alan and Merle Anderson. She met and married her husband Garry while studying at Rhema Bible College in Townsville. Together, they worked as Assemblies of God missionaries in Hong Kong before returning to Australia for further study.

Austin received her PhD from the University of Queensland. Her 2004 dissertation and subsequent book (published 2011) is entitled Kingdom-Minded People: Christian Identity and the Contributions of Chinese Business Christians.

Career
In 2006, Austin became the Academic Dean of Garden City College and began lecturing on Church History and Missions. In 2009, she started working at Southern Cross College which changed its name to Alphacrucis College later that same year. She is actively working with TEQSA to help Alphacrucis College become the first Pentecostal training college in Australia to achieve university status. She is an ordained minister with Australian Christian Churches.

Austin has secured over $100,000 in grants to fund the research of pentecostal history. Austin has also written the biographies of several key figures in Australian history including Andrew Evans, founder of the Family First political party, as well as the biography of bass player George McArdle from the Little River Band.

An article by Austin about the Prime Minister of Australia, Scott Morrison's personal faith and its influence on his response to women's rights and workplace sexual harassment, was published in the Sydney Morning Herald on 19 April 2021.  Seven letters in response were published the following day, with several suggesting that the Prime Minister's faith was not the problem, but rather his actions in response to these issues.

Selected publications

Books

Chapters

Articles

External links 
 Official website

References 

Year of birth missing (living people)
Living people
Australian theologians
University of Queensland alumni
21st-century Australian non-fiction writers
Australian religious writers
21st-century Australian women writers